Miles Xavier Johns (born  March 30, 1994) is an American mixed martial artist who competes in the Bantamweight division of the Ultimate Fighting Championship. A professional competitor since 2011, he has also formerly competed for Legacy Fighting Alliance where he was the LFA Bantamweight Champion.

Background
Miles was born and raised in Newton, Kansas along with two brothers and an older sister. One of the brothers – Elijah – is also an aspiring professional mixed martial artist. Miles started wrestling in the third grade, eventually winning the 5A Kansas state championship. Miles graduated from Newton High School, continuing to Newman University on a wrestling scholarship but became injured. By the time he was healed up from the injury, the season was over and Johns decided to drop out of college and compete in mixed martial arts.

Mixed martial arts career

Early career
Not long after dropping out of the college, a friend told him about an amateur fighting event coming up and Johns took a fight on the spot on three weeks’ notice.

Starting his professional career in 2014, Johns compiled a 8–0 record fight mostly for Legacy Fighting Alliance where he won the LFA Bantamweight Championship. After accomplishing this feat, he was invited onto Dana White's Contender Series 18, where he won a decision victory against Richie Santiago, in the process gaining a UFC contract.

Ultimate Fighting Championship

In his UFC debut, Miles Johns faced Cole Smith on September 14, 2019 at UFC Fight Night: Cowboy vs. Gaethje. Johns won a close fight by split decision.

On February 8, 2020, Johns faced Mario Bautista at UFC 247. He lost the fight via technical knockout in round two.

Johns faced Kevin Natividad on October 31, 2020 at UFC Fight Night: Hall vs. Silva. He won the fight via knockout in round three. This win earned him Performance Fight of the Night award.

Johns was scheduled to face Anderson dos Santos on July 17, 2021 at UFC on ESPN 26. However, the bout was removed hours before the show due to COVID-19 protocol issues stemming from Dos Santos' camp.  The bout was rescheduled and eventually took place at UFC 265 on August 7, 2021. Johns won the fight via knockout in round three.  This fight earned him the  Performance of the Night award.

Johns faced John Castañeda on February 5, 2022 at UFC Fight Night 200. He lost the bout via third round technical submission.

On April 19, it was reported that Miles Johns tested positive for adderall in a urine test collected at the day of  UFC Fight Night 200. As a result, he was received a six-month suspension, along with a $3,450 fine, which amounts to 15 percent of his fight purse.

Johns faced Vince Morales on November 19, 2022, at UFC Fight Night 215; replacing José Johnson. He won the fight via unanimous decision.

Personal life
Johns and his wife Hannah have three sons.

Johns graduated from Brookhaven College nursing program in December 2018 and is a registered nurse.

Championships and achievements 
Ultimate Fighting Championship
Performance of the Night (Two times) 
 Legacy Fighting Alliance
 LFA Bantamweight Champion (One Time)

Mixed martial arts record

|-
|Win
|align=center|13–2
|Vince Morales
|Decision (unanimous)
|UFC Fight Night: Nzechukwu vs. Cuțelaba
|
|align=center|3
|align=center|5:00
||Las Vegas, Nevada, United States
|
|-
|Loss
| align=center|12–2
|John Castañeda
|Technical Submission (arm-triangle choke)
|UFC Fight Night: Hermansson vs. Strickland
| 
|align=center|3
|align=center|1:38
|Las Vegas, Nevada, United States
|
|-
|Win
|align=center|12–1
|Anderson dos Santos
|KO (punch)
|UFC 265 
|
|align=center|3
|align=center|1:16
|Houston, Texas, United States
|
|-
| Win
| align=center|11–1
| Kevin Natividad
|KO (punch)
|UFC Fight Night: Hall vs. Silva
|
|align=center|3
|align=center|2:51
|Las Vegas, Nevada, United States
|
|-
| Loss
| align=center|10–1
| Mario Bautista
|TKO (flying knee and punches)
|UFC 247
|
|align=center|2
|align=center|1:41
|Houston, Texas, United States
|
|-
| Win
| align=center|10–0
| Cole Smith
| Decision (split)
| UFC Fight Night: Cowboy vs. Gaethje
| 
| align=center|3
| align=center|5:00
| Vancouver, British Columbia, Canada
| 
|-
| Win
| align=center|9–0
| Richie Santiago
|Decision (unanimous)
|Dana White's Contender Series 18
|
|align=center|3
|align=center|5:00
|Las Vegas, Nevada, United States
|
|-
| Win
| align=center|8–0
| Adrian Yanez
| Decision (split)
| LFA 55
|
|align=center|5
|align=center|5:00
|Dallas, Texas, United States
|
|-
| Win
| align=center| 7–0
| Eric Ellington
| Submission (guillotine choke)
|LFA 40
| 
| align=center| 2
| align=center| 4:13
| Dallas, Texas, United States
| 
|-
| Win
| align=center| 6–0
| Caio Machado
| Decision (unanimous)
| LFA 28
|
|align=center|3
|align=center|5:00
|Dallas, Texas, United States
|
|-
| Win
| align=center| 5–0
| Levi Mowles
| Decision (unanimous)
| LFA 16
|
|align=center|3
|align=center|5:00
|Dallas, Texas, United States
|
|-
| Win
| align=center| 4–0
| Eliazar Rodriguez
| TKO (punches)
| LFC 56
| 
| align=center| 2
| align=center| 0:38
| Dallas, Texas, United States
| 
|-
| Win
| align=center| 3–0
| Omar Benjar
| Submission (arm-triangle choke)
| Xtreme Knockout 28
| 
| align=center| 3
| align=center| 1:20
| Dallas, Texas, United States
| 
|-
| Win
| align=center| 2–0
| David Miramontes
| Decision (unanimous)
| Xtreme Knockout 27
| 
| align=center| 3
| align=center| 3:00
| Dallas, Texas, United States
|
|-
| Win
| align=center| 1–0
| Tyler Pacheco
| TKO (punches)
| 24/7 Entertainment 14 & 15
| 
| align=center| 2
| align=center| 1:27
| Midland, Texas, United States
|

See also 
 List of current UFC fighters
 List of male mixed martial artists

References

External links 
  
 

Living people
Bantamweight mixed martial artists
1994 births
American male mixed martial artists
Mixed martial artists utilizing collegiate wrestling
Ultimate Fighting Championship male fighters
American male sport wrestlers
Amateur wrestlers